Kootenay—Columbia is a federal electoral district in British Columbia, Canada, that has been represented in the House of Commons of Canada since 1997.

Geography
Consisting of:

(a) the Regional District of East Kootenay;
(b) that part of the Regional District of Central Kootenay comprising: 
 the villages of Kaslo and Salmo;
 the Town of Creston;
 the City of Nelson;
 subdivisions A, B, C, D, E, F and G;
 Creston Indian Reserve No. 1;
(c) that part of the Columbia-Shuswap Regional District comprising:
 the City of Revelstoke; 
 the Town of Golden; 
 subdivisions A and B; and
(d) Tobacco Plains Indian Reserve No. 2.

The riding borders the US states of Idaho, Montana and Washington, more than any other Canadian riding.

History
This district was created in 1996 from parts of Kootenay East and Kootenay West—Revelstoke ridings.

It was amended in 2003 to include a small part of Kootenay—Boundary—Okanagan.

The 2012 federal electoral boundaries redistribution concluded that the electoral boundaries of Kootenay—Columbia should be adjusted, and a modified electoral district of the same name will be contested in future elections. The redefined Kootenay—Columbia gains the communities of Nelson, Salmo and Kaslo and their respective surrounding areas from the current electoral district of British Columbia Southern Interior, while losing Nakusp and area to the new district of South Okanagan—West Kootenay and Needles and area to the new district of North Okanagan—Shuswap. These new boundaries were legally defined in the 2013 representation order, which came into effect upon the call of the 42nd Canadian federal election, scheduled for October 2015.

Demographics

Members of Parliament
This riding has elected the following Member of Parliament:

Current Member of Parliament

Its Member of Parliament (MP) is Rob Morrison, first elected in 2019 as a Conservative candidate.

Election results

Adjacent ridings
 British Columbia Southern Interior
 Kamloops—Thompson—Cariboo
 Okanagan—Shuswap

See also
 List of Canadian federal electoral districts
 Past Canadian electoral districts

Notes

References

External links
 Website of the Parliament of Canada
 Website of the Local Riding Association - Conservative Party of Canada

 Library of Parliament Riding Profile
 Campaign expense data from Elections Canada – 2008
 Expenditures - 2004
 Expenditures – 2000
 Expenditures – 1997
 
 

British Columbia federal electoral districts
Cranbrook, British Columbia
Nelson, British Columbia
Revelstoke, British Columbia